This article serves as an index - as complete as possible - of all the honorific orders or similar decorations received by the Thai royal family, classified by continent, awarding country and recipient.

Thai honours 

 King Maha Vajiralongkorn:
  Sovereign Grand Master of the Most Auspicious Order of the Rajamitrabhorn
  Sovereign Grand Master of the Most Illustrious Order of the Royal House of Chakri
  Sovereign Grand Master of the Ancient and Auspicious Order of the Nine Gems
  Sovereign Grand Master of the Most Illustrious Order of Chula Chom Klao
  Sovereign Grand Master of the Honourable Order of Rama
  Sovereign Grand Master of the Most Exalted Order of the White Elephant
  Sovereign Grand Master of the Most Noble Order of the Crown of Thailand
  Sovereign Grand Master of the Most Admirable Order of the Direkgunabhorn
  Sovereign Grand Master of the Order of Symbolic Propitiousness Ramkeerati 
  Sovereign of the Bravery Medal
  Sovereign of the Freeman Safeguarding Medal
  Sovereign of the Civil Dushdi Mala Medal
  Sovereign of the Border Service Medal
  Sovereign of the Chakra Mala Medal
  Recipient of the King Rama IX Royal Cypher Medal (First Class)
  Recipient of the King Rama IX Court Medal (Gold Class)
 Queen Suthida:
  Dame of the Most Illustrious Order of the Royal House of Chakri
  Dame of the Ancient and Auspicious Order of the Nine Gems
  Dame Grand Cross (First Class) of the Most Illustrious Order of Chula Chom Klao
  Dame Grand Cordon (Special Class) of the Most Exalted Order of the White Elephant
  Dame Grand Cordon (Special Class) of the Most Noble Order of the Crown of Thailand
  Member of the Order of Symbolic Propitiousness Ramkeerati
  Recipient of the King Rama IX Royal Cypher Medal (First Class)
  Recipient of the King Rama X Royal Cypher Medal (First Class)
 Queen Mother Sirikit:
  Dame of the Most Illustrious Order of the Royal House of Chakri, with diamond star
  Dame of the Ancient and Auspicious Order of the Nine Gems, with diamond star
  Dame Grand Cross (First Class) of the Most Illustrious Order of Chula Chom Klao, with diamond star
  Dame Grand Cordon (Special Class) of the Most Exalted Order of the White Elephant
  Dame Grand Cordon (Special Class) of the Most Noble Order of the Crown of Thailand
  Dame Grand Cross (First Class) of the Most Admirable Order of the Direkgunabhorn
  Member of the Order of Symbolic Propitiousness Ramkeerati
  Recipient of the Freeman Safeguarding Medal (First Class)
  Recipient of the Civil Dushdi Mala Medal
  Recipient of the Border Service Medal
  Recipient of the King Rama IX Royal Cypher Medal (First Class)
  Recipient of the King Rama X Royal Cypher Medal (First Class)
  Sovereign of the Red Cross Medal of Merit
 Princess Maha Chakri Sirindhorn, the Princess Royal:
  Dame of The Most Illustrious Order of the Royal House of Chakri
  Dame of The Ancient and Auspicious Order of the Nine Gems
  Dame Grand Cross (First Class) of The Most Illustrious Order of Chula Chom Klao
  Dame Grand Cordon (Special Class) of The Most Exalted Order of the White Elephant
  Dame Grand Cordon (Special Class) of The Most Noble Order of the Crown of Thailand
  Dame Grand Cross (First Class) of the Most Admirable Order of the Direkgunabhorn
  Member of the Order of Symbolic Propitiousness Ramkeerati
  Recipient of the Freeman Safeguarding Medal (First Class)
  Recipient of the Civil Dushdi Mala Medal
  Recipient of the Border Service Medal
  Recipient of the Chakra Mala Medal
  Recipient of the Boy Scout Citation Medal of Vajira (First Class)
  Recipient of the King Rama IX Royal Cypher Medal (First Class)
  Recipient of the King Rama X Royal Cypher Medal (First Class)
  Recipient of the King Rama IX Court Medal (Gold Class)
  Recipient of the Red Cross Medal of Appreciation (First Class)
 Princess Bajrakitiyabha, the Princess Rajasarini Siribajra:
  Dame of the Most Illustrious Order of the Royal House of Chakri
  Dame of the Ancient and Auspicious Order of the Nine Gems
  Dame Grand Cross (First Class) of the Most Illustrious Order of Chula Chom Klao
  Dame Grand Cordon (Special Class) of the Most Exalted Order of the White Elephant
  Dame Grand Cordon (Special Class) of the Most Noble Order of the Crown of Thailand
  Dame Grand Cross (First Class) of the Most Admirable Order of the Direkgunabhorn
  Member of the Order of Symbolic Propitiousness Ramkeerati
  Recipient of the King Rama IX Royal Cypher Medal (First Class)
  Recipient of the King Rama X Royal Cypher Medal (First Class)
 Princess Sirivannavari Nariratana:
  Dame of the Most Illustrious Order of the Royal House of Chakri
  Dame Grand Cross (First Class) of the Most Illustrious Order of Chula Chom Klao
  Dame Grand Cordon (Special Class) of the Most Exalted Order of the White Elephant
  Dame Grand Cordon (Special Class) of the Most Noble Order of the Crown of Thailand
  Dame Grand Cross (First Class) of the Most Admirable Order of the Direkgunabhorn
  Recipient of the King Rama IX Royal Cypher Medal (First Class)
  Recipient of the King Rama X Royal Cypher Medal (First Class)
 Prince Dipangkorn Rasmijoti:
  Knight of The Most Illustrious Order of the Royal House of Chakri
  Recipient of the King Rama IX Royal Cypher Medal (First Class)
  Recipient of the King Rama X Royal Cypher Medal (First Class)
 Princess Ubolratana Rajakanya:
  Dame of the Most Illustrious Order of the Royal House of Chakri
  Dame Grand Cross (First Class) of the Most Illustrious Order of Chula Chom Klao
  Dame Grand Cordon of the Most Exalted Order of the White Elephant
  Dame Grand Cordon (Special Class) of the Most Noble Order of the Crown of Thailand
  Recipient of the Boy Scout Citation Medal of Vajira (First Class)
  Recipient of the King Rama IX Royal Cypher Medal (First Class)
  Recipient of the King Rama X Royal Cypher Medal (First Class)
 Princess Chulabhorn Walailak, the Princess Srisavangavadhana:
  Dame of the Most Illustrious Order of the Royal House of Chakri
  Dame of the Ancient and Auspicious Order of the Nine Gems
  Dame Grand Cross (First Class) of the Most Illustrious Order of Chula Chom Klao
  Dame Grand Cordon (Special Class) of the Most Exalted Order of the White Elephant
  Dame Grand Cordon (Special Class) of the Most Noble Order of the Crown of Thailand
  Dame Grand Cross (First Class) of the Most Admirable Order of the Direkgunabhorn
  Member of the Order of Symbolic Propitiousness Ramkeerati
  Recipient of the Freeman Safeguarding Medal (First Class)
  Recipient of the Border Service Medal
  Recipient of the Chakrabarti Mala Medal
  Recipient of the King Rama IX Royal Cypher Medal (First Class)
  Recipient of the King Rama X Royal Cypher Medal (First Class)
  Recipient of the Red Cross Medal of Appreciation (First Class)
 Princess Siribha Chudabhorn:
  Dame Grand Cross (First Class) of the Most Illustrious Order of Chula Chom Klao
  Dame Grand Cordon (Special Class) of the Most Exalted Order of the White Elephant
  Dame Grand Cordon (Special Class) of the Most Noble Order of the Crown of Thailand
  Recipient of the King Rama IX Royal Cypher Medal (First Class)
  Recipient of the King Rama X Royal Cypher Medal (First Class)
 Princess Aditayadorn Kitikhun:
  Dame Grand Cross (First Class) of the Most Illustrious Order of Chula Chom Klao
  Dame Grand Cordon (Special Class) of the Most Exalted Order of the White Elephant
  Dame Grand Cordon (Special Class) of the Most Noble Order of the Crown of Thailand
  Recipient of the King Rama X Royal Cypher Medal (First Class)
 Princess Soamsawali, the Princess Suddhanarinatha:
  Dame of the Most Illustrious Order of the Royal House of Chakri
  Dame of the Ancient and Auspicious Order of the Nine Gems
  Dame Grand Cross (First Class) of the Most Illustrious Order of Chula Chom Klao
  Dame Grand Cordon (Special Class) of the Most Exalted Order of the White Elephant
  Dame Grand Cordon (Special Class) of the Most Noble Order of the Crown of Thailand
  Dame Grand Cross (First Class) of the Most Admirable Order of the Direkgunabhorn
  Member of the Order of Symbolic Propitiousness Ramkeerati
  Recipient of the King Rama IX Royal Cypher Medal (First Class)
  Recipient of the King Rama X Royal Cypher Medal (First Class)

Other Members 

 Juthavachara Vivacharawongse (Vajiralongkorn's son):
 not yet bestowed
 Vacharaesorn Vivacharawongse (Vajiralongkorn's son):
 not yet bestowed
 Chakriwat Vivacharawongse (Vajiralongkorn's son):
 not yet bestowed
 Vatchrawee Vivacharawongse (Vajiralongkorn's son):
 not yet bestowed
 Chao Khun Phra Sineenat (Vajiralongkorn's concubine):
  Dame Grand Cross (First Class) of the Most Illustrious Order of Chula Chom Klao
  Dame Grand Cordon (Special Class) of the Most Exalted Order of the White Elephant
  Dame Grand Cordon (Special Class) of the Most Noble Order of the Crown of Thailand
  Recipient of the King Rama X Royal Cypher Medal (First Class)
 Than Phu Ying Ploypailin Jensen (Ubolratana's daughter):
  Dame Grand Cordon (Special Class) of the Most Noble Order of the Crown of Thailand
  Dame Grand Commander (Second Class, Upper Grade) of the Most Illustrious Order of Chula Chom Klao
  Recipient of the King Rama IX Royal Cypher Medal (First Class)
  Recipient of the King Rama X Royal Cypher Medal (First Class)
 Than Phu Ying Sirikitiya Jensen (Ubolratana's daughter):
  Dame Grand Cordon (Special Class) of the Most Noble Order of the Crown of Thailand
  Dame Grand Commander (Second Class, Upper Grade) of the Most Illustrious Order of Chula Chom Klao
  Recipient of the King Rama IX Royal Cypher Medal (First Class)
  Recipient of the King Rama X Royal Cypher Medal (First Class)
 Than Phu Ying Dhasanawalaya Sornsongkram (Vajiralongkorn's cousin):
  Dame Grand Cordon (Special Class) of the Most Exalted Order of the White Elephant
  Dame Grand Cordon (Special Class) of the Most Noble Order of the Crown of Thailand
  Dame Grand Commander (Second Class, Upper Grade) of the Most Illustrious Order of Chula Chom Klao
  Dame Grand Cross (First Class) of the Most Admirable Order of the Direkgunabhorn
  Recipient of the King Rama IX Royal Cypher Medal (First Class)
  Recipient of the King Rama X Royal Cypher Medal (First Class)
 Jitat Sornsongkram (Dhasanawalaya's son):
  Knight Grand Cordon (Special Class) of the Most Noble Order of the Crown of Thailand
  Grand Companion (Third Class, Upper Grade) of the Most Illustrious Order of Chula Chom Klao

Former Members 

 Than Phu Ying Srirasmi Suwadee (Vajiralongkorn's third wife):
  Dame Grand Cross (First Class) of the Most Illustrious Order of Chula Chom Klao
  Dame Grand Cordon (Special Class) of the Most Exalted Order of the White Elephant
  Dame Grand Cordon (Special Class) of the Most Noble Order of the Crown of Thailand
  Recipient of the King Rama IX Royal Cypher Medal (First Class)

Cadet houses Royal Members 

 Bhanubandhu

 Princess Uthaikanya Bhanubandhu:
  Dame Commander (Second Class) of the Most Exalted Order of the White Elephant
  Dame Commander (Second Class) of the Most Noble Order of the Crown of Thailand
  Recipient of the Chakrabarti Mala Medal
 Phanwarophat Svetarundra (Former Princess):
 not yet bestowed

 Jayankura

 Princess Uthaithiang Jayankura:
 not yet bestowed

 Prince Charunritdet Jayankura:
 not yet bestowed

 Svastivatana

 Prince Pusan Svastivatana:
  Knight Grand Cross (First Class) of the Most Illustrious Order of Chula Chom Klao
  Knight Grand Cordon (Special Class) of the Most Exalted Order of the White Elephant
  Knight Grand Cordon (Special Class) of the Most Noble Order of the Crown of Thailand
  Recipient of the Victory Medal - Vietnam War, with flames
  Recipient of the Chakra Mala Medal
  Recipient of the King Rama X Royal Cypher Medal (Second Class)

 Paribatra

 Induratana Paribatra (Former Princess):
 not yet bestowed

 Yugala

 Prince Nawaphan Yugala:
  Knight Grand Cross (First Class) of the Most Noble Order of the Crown of Thailand
 Prince Mongkhonchaloem Yugala:
  Knight Grand Cordon (Special Class) of the Most Exalted Order of the White Elephant
  Knight Grand Cordon (Special Class) of the Most Noble Order of the Crown of Thailand
  Knight Grand Commander (Second Class, Upper Grade) of the Most Illustrious Order of Chula Chom Klao
  Recipient of the King Rama X Royal Cypher Medal (Third Class)
 Prince Chaloemsuek Yugala:
  Knight Grand Cordon (Special Class) of the Most Exalted Order of the White Elephant
  Knight Grand Cordon (Special Class) of the Most Noble Order of the Crown of Thailand
  Knight Grand Commander (Second Class, Upper Grade) of the Most Illustrious Order of Chula Chom Klao
  Member of Silver Medal (Seventh Class) of the Most Admirable Order of the Direkgunabhorn
  Recipient of the Chakra Mala Medal
  Recipient of the King Rama X Royal Cypher Medal (Third Class)
  Recipient of the Red Cross Medal of Appreciation (Second Class)
 Prince Thikhamphon Yugala:
  Knight Grand Cordon (Special Class) of the Most Exalted Order of the White Elephant
  Knight Grand Cordon (Special Class) of the Most Noble Order of the Crown of Thailand
  Knight Commander (Second Class, Lower Grade) of the Most Illustrious Order of Chula Chom Klao
  Recipient of the King Rama X Royal Cypher Medal (Third Class)
 Prince Chatrichalerm Yugala:
  Knight Grand Cordon (Special Class) of the Most Exalted Order of the White Elephant
  Knight Grand Cordon (Special Class) of the Most Noble Order of the Crown of Thailand
  Grand Companion (Third Class, Upper Grade) of the Most Illustrious Order of Chula Chom Klao
  Companion (Fourth Class) of the Most Admirable Order of the Direkgunabhorn
  Recipient of the King Rama IX Royal Cypher Medal (Fourth Class)
 Prince Chulcherm Yugala:
  Knight Grand Cordon (Special Class) of the Most Exalted Order of the White Elephant
  Knight Grand Cordon (Special Class) of the Most Noble Order of the Crown of Thailand
  Knight Grand Commander (Second Class, Upper Grade) of the Most Illustrious Order of Chula Chom Klao
  Recipient of the Freeman Safeguarding Medal (Second Class)
  Recipient of the King Rama X Royal Cypher Medal (Third Class)
 Princess Nopphadonchaloemsri Yugala:
 not yet bestowed
 Than Phu Ying Phansawali Kitiyakara (Former Princess):
  Dame Grand Cordon (Special Class) of the Most Exalted Order of the White Elephant
  Dame Grand Cordon (Special Class) of the Most Noble Order of the Crown of Thailand
  Dame Grand Commander (Second Class, Upper Grade) of the Most Illustrious Order of Chula Chom Klao
 Phanuma Yugala (Former Princess):
 not yet bestowed
 Sisawangwong Bunyachittradun (Former Princess):
  Dame Grand Cross (First Class) of the Most Noble Order of the Crown of Thailand
 Phummariphirom Shell (Former Princess):
 not yet bestowed
 Patthamanarangsi Senanarong (Former Princess):
  Dame Grand Cross (First Class) of the Most Exalted Order of the White Elephant
  Dame Grand Cross (First Class) of the Most Noble Order of the Crown of Thailand

 Vudhijaya

 Khun Ying Wutchaloem Vudhijaya (Former Princess):
  Dame Commander (Second Class) of the Most Exalted Order of the White Elephant
  Commander (Third Class) of the Most Noble Order of the Crown of Thailand
  Companion (Fourth Class) of the Most Admirable Order of the Direkgunabhorn
  Member (Fourth Class) of the Most Illustrious Order of Chula Chom Klao

Asian foreign honours

Middle East

Iran

Imperial State of Iran 

 Queen Mother Sirikit : First Class of The Order of the Pleiades

Far East

Brunei 

 King Maha Vajiralongkorn : Junior (Sri Utama) of the Family Order of Seri Utama (DK II)
 Queen Mother Sirikit : Junior (Sri Utama) of the Most Esteemed Family Order of Seri Utama (DK II)
 Princess Maha Chakri Sirindhorn, the Princess Royal : Junior (Sri Utama) of the Most Esteemed Family Order of Seri Utama (DK II)
 Princess Soamsawali, the Princess Suddhanarinatha : Junior (Sri Utama) of the Family Order of Seri Utama (DK II)

India 

 Princess Maha Chakri Sirindhorn, the Princess Royal : Padma Bhushan

Indonesia 

 Queen Mother Sirikit : First Class of the Star of Mahaputera

Japan 

 King Maha Vajiralongkorn : Grand Cordon of the Supreme Order of the Chrysanthemum
 Queen Mother Sirikit : Grand Cordon of the Order of the Precious Crown
 Princess Maha Chakri Sirindhorn, the Princess Royal : Grand Cordon of the Order of the Precious Crown
 Princess Chulabhorn Walailak, the Princess Srisavangavadhana: Grand Cordon of the Order of the Precious Crown
 Princess Soamsawali, the Princess Suddhanarinatha : Grand Cordon of the Order of the Sacred Treasure

Laos

Kingdom of Laos 

 Queen Mother Sirikit : Grand Cordon of The Most Esteemed Order of the Million Elephants and the White Parasol

Lao PDR 

 Queen Mother Sirikit : Phoxay Lane Xang
 Princess Maha Chakri Sirindhorn, the Princess Royal : National Gold Medal

Malaysia 

 King Maha Vajiralongkorn : Honorary Grand Commander of the Most Esteemed Order of the Defender of the Realm – SMN.
 Queen Mother Sirikit : Honorary Recipient of the Most Exalted Order of the Crown of the Realm (Darjah Utama Seri Mahkota Negara – DMN)
 Princess Maha Chakri Sirindhorn, the Princess Royal : Honorary Grand Commander of The Most Esteemed Order of Loyalty to the Crown of Malaysia – SSM

Kelantan 

 Queen Mother Sirikit : Recipient of the Royal Family Order or Star of Yunus (Darjah Kerabat Yang Amat Di Hormati)

Selangor 

 Queen Mother Sirikit : First Class of the Royal Family Order of Selangor (Darjah Kerabat Yang Amat Dihormati Kelas Pertama, DK I)

Terengganu 

 King Maha Vajiralongkorn : The Most Honorable Royal Family Order of Terengganu – Second Class (DK II)
 Queen Mother Sirikit : Member of the Royal Family Order of Terengganu (DKR)

Mongolia 

 Princess Maha Chakri Sirindhorn, the Princess Royal : The Order of the Polar Star

Nepal

Kingdom of Nepal 
 King Maha Vajiralongkorn : Member of The Most Glorious Order of the Benevolent Ruler
 Queen Mother Sirikit : Member of the Nepal Decoration of Honour (1986) 
 Princess Maha Chakri Sirindhorn, the Princess Royal : Member of The Most Glorious Order of the Benevolent Ruler
 Princess Chulabhorn Walailak, the Princess Srisavangavadhana :  Member of the Most Glorious Order of the Benevolent Ruler
 Princess Soamsawali, the Princess Suddhanarinatha :  Member of the Most Glorious Order of the Benevolent Ruler

Pakistan 

 Princess Maha Chakri Sirindhorn, the Princess Royal : Hilal-e-Pakistan

Philippines 

 Queen Mother Sirikit : Grand Collar (Maringal na Kuwintas) of The Order of the Golden Heart

North Korea 
 King Maha Vajiralongkorn : First Class of the Order of the National Flag

South Korea 

 King Maha Vajiralongkorn : Grand Gwanghwa Medal (First Class) of Order of Diplomatic Service Merit
 Queen Mother Sirikit : Grand Order of Mugunghwa
 Princess Maha Chakri Sirindhorn, the Princess Royal : Grand Gwanghwa Medal (First Class) of Order of Diplomatic Service Merit

Taiwan 
 Queen Mother Sirikit : Special Grand Cordon of The Order of Propitious Clouds

Oceanian foreign honours

Tonga 

 Princess Maha Chakri Sirindhorn, the Princess Royal : Knight Grand Cross with Collar of the Order of the Crown of Tonga

European foreign honours

Austria 

 Queen Mother Sirikit : Grand Star of the Decoration of Honour for Services to the Republic of Austria
 Princess Maha Chakri Sirindhorn, the Princess Royal : Grand Decoration of Honour in Gold with Sash of the Decoration of Honour for Services to the Republic of Austria
 Princess Bajrakitiyabha, the Princess Rajasarini Siribajra : Grand Decoration of Honour in Gold with Sash of the Decoration of Honour for Services to the Republic of Austria

Belgium 

 Queen Mother Sirikit : Grand Cordon of the Order of Leopold

Denmark 

 King Maha Vajiralongkorn : Knight of the Order of the Elephant
 Queen Mother Sirikit : Knight of the Order of the Elephant
 Princess Maha Chakri Sirindhorn, the Princess Royal : Grand Cross of the Order of the Dannebrog

France 

 Princess Maha Chakri Sirindhorn, the Princess Royal : Commander of Ordre des Palmes Academiques

Germany

West Germany 

 King Maha Vajiralongkorn : Grand Cross 1st Class of the Order of Merit of the Federal Republic of Germany
 Queen Mother Sirikit : Grand Cross Special Class of the Order of Merit of the Federal Republic of Germany
 Princess Maha Chakri Sirindhorn, the Princess Royal : Grand Cross 1st Class of The Order of Merit of the Federal Republic of Germany
 Princess Chulabhorn Walailak, the Princess Srisavangavadhana : Grand Cross 1st Class of the Order of Merit of the Federal Republic of Germany
 Princess Soamsawali, the Princess Suddhanarinatha : Grand Cross 1st Class of the Order of Merit of the Federal Republic of Germany

Greece

Kingdom of Greece 

 Queen Mother Sirikit : Grand Cross of the Order of Beneficence

Italy 

 Queen Mother Sirikit : Grand Cross of The Order of Merit of the Italian Republic

Luxembourg 

 King Maha Vajiralongkorn : Knight Grand Cross of the Order of Adolphe of Nassau
 Queen Mother Sirikit : Knight of the Order of the Gold Lion of the House of Nassau

Netherlands 

 King Maha Vajiralongkorn : Grand Cross of the Order of the Crown
 Queen Mother Sirikit : Knight Grand Cross of the Order of the Netherlands Lion
 Princess Maha Chakri Sirindhorn, the Princess Royal : Grand Cross of the Order of the Crown
 Princess Ubolratana Rajakanya : Knight Grand Cross of the Order of Orange-Nassau
 Princess Chulabhorn Walailak, the Princess Srisavangavadhana : Knight Grand Cross of the Order of Orange-Nassau
 Princess Soamsawali, the Princess Suddhanarinatha : Knight Grand Cross of the Order of Orange-Nassau

Norway 

 Queen Mother Sirikit : Grand Cross of the Royal Norwegian Order of St. Olav

Portugal 

 King Maha Vajiralongkorn : Grand Cross of the Order of Aviz
 Queen Mother Sirikit : Grand Cross of the Order of Saint James of the Sword

Romania 

 Queen Mother Sirikit : Grand Cross of the Order of the Star of Romania

Spain

Spanish State 
 Queen Mother Sirikit : Knight Grand Cross of The Order of Isabella the Catholic

Kingdom of Spain 
 King Maha Vajiralongkorn : Grand Cross of the Royal and Distinguished Order of Charles III
 Queen Mother Sirikit : Grand Cross of the Royal and Distinguished Spanish Order of Charles III
 Princess Maha Chakri Sirindhorn, the Princess Royal : Knight Grand Cross of the Order of Isabella the Catholic
 Princess Chulabhorn Walailak, the Princess Srisavangavadhana : Knight Grand Cross of The Order of Isabella the Catholic
 Princess Soamsawali, the Princess Suddhanarinatha : Knight Grand Cross of The Order of Isabella the Catholic

Sweden 

 King  Maha Vajiralongkorn : Knight of the Royal Order of the Seraphim
 Queen Mother Sirikit :  Member of the Royal Order of the Seraphim
 Princess Maha Chakri Sirindhorn, the Princess Royal : Member of the Royal Order of the Seraphim
 Princess Chulabhorn Walailak, the Princess Srisavangavadhana : Member of the Royal Order of the Seraphim

United Kingdom 

 King Maha Vajiralongkorn : Knight Grand Cross of the Royal Victorian Order
 Princess Maha Chakri Sirindhorn, the Princess Royal : Dame Grand Cross of the Royal Victorian Order
 Princess Chulabhorn Walailak, the Princess Srisavangavadhana : Dame Grand Cross of the Royal Victorian Order

American foreign honours

South America

Peru 
 King Maha Vajiralongkorn : Knight Grand Cross of the Order of the Sun of Peru
 Princess Maha Chakri Sirindhorn, the Princess Royal : Grand Cross of the Order of the Sun of Peru
 Princess Chulabhorn Walailak, the Princess Srisavangavadhana: Grand Cross of the Order of Merit for Distinguished Services

African foreign honours

Ethiopia

Ethiopian Empire 

 Queen Mother Sirikit : Grand Cross of the Order of the Queen of Sheba

International organizations honours

North Atlantic Treaty Organization 

 Prince Chaloemsuek Yugala : NATO Non-Article 5 medal for NTM-Iraq

See also 
List of Thai Honours awarded to Heads of State and Royals

References

Royal Family
Thailand
Thai royalty
Honours of the Thai Royal Family